"The Death of a Government Clerk" is a short story by Anton Chekhov published originally the Oskolki magazine's 2 July, No. 27 issue, subtitled "The Incident" (Случай) and signed A. Chekhonte (А. Чехонте). "Received the "Fragments of Moscow Life" and "The Death of the Government Clerk. Both are delicious", Nikolai Leykin, the Oskolkis editor, informed the author by a 29 June letter. It was included (without the subtitle) into Chekhov's 1886 collection Motley Stories (Пёстрые рассказы) published in Saint Petersburg and featured unchanged in its 2–14 editions (1891–1899).

Plot
Ivan Chervyakov, a petty government official, while in the theatre, sneezes right upon the head of a man sitting in front of  him, who happens to be General Brizzhalov, a high-ranking government official. He spends the evening and the next day fawning before his sneeze victim trying to extract forgiveness, but what he succeeds instead is only bringing out a fit of rage in him. Shocked, Chervyakov returns home to lie there and die, due to the sheer stress of having endured such horror.

References

External links
 Смерть чиновника. Original Russian text
 The Death of a Government Clerk. Translation by Constance Garnett

Short stories by Anton Chekhov
1883 short stories
Works originally published in Russian magazines